Alan Gardner may refer to:

Alan Gardner, 1st Baron Gardner (1742–1809), British Royal Navy officer and politician
Alan Gardner, 2nd Baron Gardner (1770–1815), British Royal Navy officer
Alan Gardner, 3rd Baron Gardner (1810–1883), British Whig politician
Alan Coulstoun Gardner, British Member of Parliament for Ross, 1906–1908